Katie Zolnikov is an American politician serving as a member of the Montana House of Representatives from the 45th district. Elected in November 2020, she assumed office on January 4, 2021. Zolnikov succeeded her husband Daniel Zolnikov after he resigned from the House in 2020.

References 

Living people
Women state legislators in Montana
Republican Party members of the Montana House of Representatives
1997 births
21st-century American women